The Long Dumb Road is a 2018 American road trip comedy film written, directed and produced by Hannah Fidell and co-written by Carson D. Mell. It stars Tony Revolori, Jason Mantzoukas, Taissa Farmiga, Grace Gummer, Casey Wilson, Pamela Reed, and Ron Livingston.

The film had its world premiere at the Sundance Film Festival on January 26, 2018. It was released on November 9, 2018, by Universal Pictures.

Premise
Two guys serendipitously meet at a time when they both find themselves at personal crossroads. They then decide to embark on an unplanned road trip together across the American Southwest.

Cast
 Tony Revolori as Nathan
 Jason Mantzoukas as Richard
 Taissa Farmiga as Rebecca
 Grace Gummer as Nina
 Casey Wilson as Sharon Richards
 Pamela Reed as Dotty
 Ron Livingston as François
 Ciara Bravo as Ashly Richards
 Annie Lederman as Monica
 Lindsay Burdge as Girl in Car
 Will Brittain as Dude in Car

Production

Development
At South by Southwest in March 2015, where her film 6 Years was premiering, director Hannah Fidell revealed that she had co-written a screenplay for a road trip comedy film with her friend Carson D. Mell, writer of Silicon Valley. The previous year, she had directed a short film version of the script, titled The Road, with Mell and Peter Vack starring in the main roles and Andrew Droz Palermo serving as director of photography.

Casting
On April 12, 2017, as additional photography was about to commence, it was reported that Tony Revolori and Jason Mantzoukas would play the roles Mell and Vack portrayed in the short film version. Taissa Farmiga, Grace Gummer, Ron Livingston, Casey Wilson, Pamela Reed, and Ciara Bravo were cast in supporting roles.

Filming
Principal photography began in January 2017 in Albuquerque, New Mexico. Filming continued in Albuquerque and Belen, New Mexico in April 2017.

Release
The Long Dumb Road had its world premiere at the Sundance Film Festival on January 26, 2018. Shortly after, Universal Pictures acquired distribution rights to the film. It was released on November 9, 2018.

Reception
The site's critical consensus reads, "The Long Dumb Road navigates the odd couple road trip comedy formula fairly smoothly, thanks mainly to the chemistry between Tony Revolori and Jason Mantzoukas." Metacritic assigned the film a weighted average score of 64 out of 100, based on reviews from 12 critics, indicating "generally favorable reviews".

Amy Nicholson of Variety gave a positive review, writing, "The adventure is aimless, but the company is good," and praised the film for paying attention to character over broad comedy.

References

External links
 
 

2018 films
2018 independent films
2018 comedy films
2010s comedy road movies
2010s buddy comedy films
American buddy comedy films
American comedy road movies
Films directed by Hannah Fidell
Films scored by Keegan DeWitt
Films shot in New Mexico
Universal Pictures films
2010s English-language films
2010s American films